Fedde Leysen (born 9 July 2003) is a Belgian footballer who plays for Jong PSV as a defender.

References

External links

2003 births
Living people
Belgian footballers
Jong PSV players
Eerste Divisie players
Association football defenders
Belgian expatriate footballers
Belgian expatriates in the Netherlands
Expatriate footballers in the Netherlands
Belgium youth international footballers